Christmas Harmony: Vision Factory Presents (stylized as CHRISTMAS HARMONY ～VISION FACTORY presents～) is a compilation album of composed of Christmas-themed songs by various Vision Factory artists. It was released shortly before the holiday season on November 21, 2007 as a 2-Disc bundle.

In December 2006, Vision Factory held a mobile contest titled "Christmas Songs You Choose", in which certain artists were chosen to take part in creating a Christmas album the following year.

The album charted at #89 on the Oricon Albums Charts.

Track listing

Charts

References

External links
Oricon Information

2007 compilation albums
Avex Group albums
Avex Group compilation albums
2007 Christmas albums
Lead (band) albums
Da Pump songs
W-inds songs
MAX (band) albums